Kunova Teplica is a village and municipality in the Rožňava District in the Košice Region of middle-eastern Slovakia.

History
In historical records the village was first mentioned in 1243.

Geography
The village lies at an altitude of 250 metres and covers an area of 8.418 km².
It has a population of about 640 people.

Culture
The village has a public library, two football pitches, a kindergarten. In addition, the village also has a cultural centre, which can be rented out to host dances, and parties. It also houses ping pong tables, and a currently inactive library. There  is also a school that is situated parallel to the cultural centre, but the school had to be closed down, most likely because of the high influx of gypsy children entering the school. Finally, there is monument dedicated to fallen Hungarian soldiers during the two world wars, it is situated directly in front of the church.

Demographics
Historically, the village has always been primarily white Hungarian. Recently however, Slovak and Roma (Gypsy) immigration has had profound effects on the demographics of the village. There has been an alarming increase of Roma in the village, with their population increasing over 500% in the last two decades, climbing to almost 50% of the total population. In terms of language, most of the village could be classified as bilingual, with both language groups (Slovak and Hungarian) having general understanding of the other.

Economy
The local steel factory situated in the village is its greatest economic contributor, employing not only the locals, but the surrounding area as well. In addition, the village has two soccer fields (a significant feat for a village of such low population). The more recently built soccer field's quality even exceeds that of the largest town in the area, Rožňava. 
The village also has three grocery stores, two pubs, and a bar.

References

External links
 Kunova Teplica
https://web.archive.org/web/20070427022352/http://www.statistics.sk/mosmis/eng/run.html

Villages and municipalities in Rožňava District